The 41-Year-Old Virgin Who Knocked Up Sarah Marshall and Felt Superbad About It is an American feature film parody that spoofs several of Judd Apatow's films: The 40-Year-Old Virgin, Knocked Up, Superbad, and Forgetting Sarah Marshall. The main plot follows Andy (Bryan Callen), a 41-year-old who desperately wants to lose his virginity, along with his teenage roommates who have similar goals.

According to producer and director Craig Moss, the original title was much longer, "more of a paragraph", and had to be cut down to the final version. On set, the film was called Slumdog Virgin, a reference to a spoof of Slumdog Millionaire included in the film.

The film was released direct-to-DVD on June 8, 2010.

Plot
Andy is a 41 year old virgin who lives with his "high school age" friends Seth, Sanjay, Jonah and Michael. He works part-time at a club as a failed standup comedian with his friend Blaqguy, who suffers from Benjamin Button's Disease. Seemingly oblivious to any attempts by women to sleep with him, he has remained a virgin and has not even masturbated, much to the chagrin of Blaqguy. One night at the club, he meets Kim and seems to hit it off with her but she receives a promotion and leaves abruptly, leaving behind her false leg. Later that night over a poker game, his friends learn of Andy's lifelong virginity and attempt to help him lose it by various means, all of which fail specaturly. 

He later meets Sarah Marshall, who immediately takes a liking to Andy despite his awkward nature. After vomiting in his car, she attempts to sleep with him but he loses his confidence and flees. Confronted by Seth, Andy regains his confidence and returns to Sarah but discovers Blaqguy, now in his pubescent stage, sleeping with Sarah. A fight breaks out between the two, which ends with Andy covered in feces. The next day, Sarah arrives at Andy's apartment fully pregnant (to due to her being half Mexican), claiming that the child is Andy's. He denies it and she leaves him.

Seeking respite from his woes, Andy goes on vacation to Hawaii, where he reconnects with Kim, who now works as a manager at the hotel Andy is staying at. Andy discovers that Sarah and her new boyfriend, Aldus Snow, are staying in the room adjacent to his. Once again denying the baby is his, Sarah and Aldus have loud sex in an attempt to get Andy to leave. That night, Andy goes on a date with Kim and when they attempt to have sex, Sarah interrupts and a fight breaks out. Sarah and Kim both subsequently leave Andy. After a brief encounter with Mace Windu and Yoda, Andy learns that virginity allows him to live longer and gain control of the force but rejects it after learning his scrotum with inflate in size. Andy reconciles with Kim after being struck by a car and they are married soon after. On their wedding night, Andy and Kim finally have sex but Andy's semen has backed up with such force that he ejects Kim through a window when he climaxes, subsequently flooding California and thwarting a missle attack by Kim Jong il. 

A subplot involving Jonah, Michael and their friend McAnalovin' also occurs throughout the course of the movie. After being picked up by police officers Beat and Yo' Ass for using a false ID to acquire alcohol, McAnalovin' goes on a Grand Theft Auto IV-style adventure that unwittingly unleashes an army of Mexicans upon himself and the officers. Jonah becomes separated and is accused on being a pedophile after an encounter with Chris Hansen. The two eventually regroup and manage to drive to Hawaii in the car that strikes Andy but are both killed by the Mexicans. Michael, meanwhile, has fallen in with a group of lactose-intolerant vampires led by Edward Cullen.

Cast

Reception
R. L. Shaffer of IGN called it "a painful, unfunny, unoriginal, sloppy mess of a movie", while Brad McKay of Collider stated, "It’s not funny or entertaining." Brian Orndorf of DVD Talk recommended that his readers not "give Craig Moss your time or your money. Watch coverage of the BP oil disaster instead. I guarantee it's funnier."

References

External links

 
 

2010s parody films
American direct-to-video films
American parody films
Direct-to-video comedy films
2010s English-language films
Films about virginity
20th Century Fox direct-to-video films
2010 comedy films
2010 films
Films directed by Craig Moss
2010s American films
2010 directorial debut films